César Miguel (4 August 1892 – 10 August 1974) was a Spanish fencer. He competed in the individual épée event at the 1924 Summer Olympics.

References

External links
 

1892 births
1974 deaths
Spanish male épée fencers
Olympic fencers of Spain
Fencers at the 1924 Summer Olympics